

Events 

January 1 – First performance of William Boyce's "At length, th’imperious Lord of War".
March 24 – Christoph Willibald Gluck leaves Vienna, bound for Bologna where his opera Il trionfo di Clelia is to be premièred.
April 26 – Gluck is awarded a pension of 600 florins by Empress Maria Theresa.
May 14 – Nuovo Teatro Pubblico in Bologna opens with the première of Gluck's Il trionfo di Clelia; it is the first major opera house to be constructed with public funds and owned by the municipality.
May 26 – In Paris, François-Joseph Gossec goes to court to retrieve property from the estate of his late patron Alexandre Le Riche de La Poupelinière.
July 9 – Mozart family grand tour: The family of Wolfgang Amadeus Mozart sets out on a European tour, ending this year in Paris.
 James Hook becomes musical director of Marylebone Gardens in London.
 St Cecilia's Hall is opened by Edinburgh Musical Society as the first purpose-built concert hall in Scotland, the second in Britain.

Popular music
 none listed

Opera
Johann Christian Bach - Orione, ossia Diana vendicata (premiered February 19 in London)
Pietro Guglielmi – Tito Manlio
Joseph Haydn – Acide
Niccolò Jommelli – Didone abbandonata (third version)
Vincenzo Manfredini – Carlo Magno
Niccolò Piccinni – Le donne vendicate
Tommaso Traetta – Ifigenia in Tauride

Classical music
Carl Friedrich Abel – 6 Flute Concertos, WK 46–51
Johann Georg Albrechtsberger – Applausus musicus (cantata)
Johann Christian Bach – 6 Keyboard Concertos, Op. 1
François Joseph Gossec – 6 Symphonies, Op. 6
Joseph Haydn – Symphonies Nos. 12 and 13
Michael Haydn – Symphony in G major "Divertimento"; Symphony in B-flat major, Perger 51 "La Confidenza"
Johann Joachim Quantz – Horn Concerto in E-flat major, QV 5:Anh.14
Giuseppe Tartini – 6 Violin Sonatas, Op. 9
Georg Philipp Telemann – Gott, man lobet dich in der Stille (cantata)

Methods and theory writings 

 Johann Franz Peter Deysinger – Gründlicher Unterricht die Orgel und das Clavier wohl schlagen zu lernen
 Ignaz Franz Xaver Kürzinger – Getreuer Unterricht zum Singen mit Manieren, und die Violin zu spielen
 Friedrich Wilhelm Marpurg – Anleitung zur Musik überhaupt, und zur Singkunst besonders
 Cristiano Miller – Porta Armonica

Births
February 20 – Adalbert Gyrowetz, composer (died 1850)
March 18 – Marie Christine Björn, ballerina
March 21 – Johann Paul Friedrich Richter, librettist and novelist (died 1825)
April 2 – Giacomo Gotifredo Ferrari, Italian composer (died 1842)
April 7 – Domenico Dragonetti, double bass virtuoso and composer (died 1846)
May 15 – Franz Danzi, composer (died 1826)
June 14 – Johann Simon Mayr, composer (died 1845)
by June 15 – Franz Danzi, German composer (died 1826)
June 22 – Étienne Méhul, composer (died 1817)
December 12 – Margareta Alströmer, singer and artist (died 1816)
Date unknown – Johann Andreas Amon, composer and musician (died 1825)

Deaths
January 11 – Giovanni Benedetto Platti, Italian composer (born 1697)
February 7 – Christoph Schaffrath, composer (born 1709)
February 12 (buried) – Gottfried Heinrich Bach, keyboardist son of Johann Sebastian Bach (born 1724)
February 17 – Christoph Schaffrath, German composer (born 1709)
 May 30 – Gustaviana Schröder, Swedish singer (born 1701)
June 1 – Johann Caspar Vogler, composer
July 16 – Jacques Hotteterre, French composer (born 1673)
July 17 – Wenzel Raimund Pirck, composer
July 22 – John Dalton, librettist and poet (born 1709)
August 14 – Giovanni Battista Somis, composer
September 26 – John Byrom, librettist and poet (born 1692)
December 2 – Carl August Thielo, composer
unknown date – Johann Gottlieb Janitsch, composer (born 1708)
probable – Nicola Logroscino, composer (born 1698)

Notes

 
18th century in music
Music by year